The Major AWGIE Award is awarded by the Australian Writers Guild for the outstanding script of the year at the annual AWGIE Awards for Australian performance writing.
It is selected from individual category winners across the range of performance writing categories, covering film, television, stage, radio and interactive media.

Winners
The tables below show the winning writer(s) and work in each year and the work's category, since the awards began.

1960s

1970s

1980s

1990s

2000s

2010s

2020s

References

AWGIE Awards